Kate Cook (born 24 April 1962) is a nutrition and wellness expert, author and keynote speaker who lives in the UK. She is a graduate in History, Economic History and Politics from Royal Holloway College, London but later went on to study nutrition for three years at the Institute for Optimum Nutrition.

Cook owns a Harley Street practice and still retains a small clinic, although her main focus is the transformation of health in the workplace and transforming the health of restaurants and work place restaurants as a food consultant.

Cook appeared as the nutritionist in The Truth About Beauty TV series with Martine McCutcheon (2008), and has been featured in magazines such as Zest, Marie Claire, Red and The Sunday Express. Kate wrote a column for Closer magazine for a number of years (2006).

Author
As an author Kate Cook has published Get Healthy For Good (52 Brilliant Ideas) (2003), Be Incredibly Healthy with Sally Brown (2007), Drop a Dress Size with Eve Cameron (53 Brilliant Ideas) (2007), Shape Up Your Life with Penny Ferguson (2007), An (Un)fit Mother (2008)  and The Corporate Wellness Bible (2013).

References

1962 births
Living people
British self-help writers